Thinicola is a genus of legume in the subfamily Faboideae with only one species, Thinicola incana, native to Australia.

References

Brongniartieae
Monotypic Fabaceae genera
Flora of Australia